Thirteen Old Donkeys is a 1958 West German comedy film directed by Hans Deppe and starring Hans Albers, Marianne Hoppe and Karin Dor. It was one of the final performances of the veteran star Albers. It was made at the Wandsbek Studios by the Hamburg-based Real Film. The film's sets were designed by the art directors Mathias Matthies and Ellen Schmidt.

Cast
 Hans Albers as Josef Krapp
 Marianne Hoppe as Martha Krapp
 Karin Dor as Monika
 Gunnar Möller as Walter
 Günther Lüders as Pastor
 Werner Peters as Oberlehrer Kasten
 Joseph Offenbach as Bennekamp
 Robert Meyn as Ess
 Josef Dahmen as Dr.Köster
 Erna Sellmer as Steinberger
 Ursula Wolff as Änne - Kind
 Isabelle Carlson as Franziska - Kind
 Peter Badura as Leo, Kind
 Rainer Ehrhardt as Andreas, Kind
 Hans Fitze as Bürgermeister
 Jost Ludwig as Moritz, Zwilling - Kind
 Lutz Ludwig as Max, Zwilling - Kind
 Sabine Schmiedel as Malwinchen - Kind
 Peter Uwe Witt as Hubert - Kind

References

Bibliography 
 Bock, Hans-Michael & Bergfelder, Tim. The Concise CineGraph. Encyclopedia of German Cinema. Berghahn Books, 2009.

External links
 

West German films
German comedy films
1958 comedy films
1950s German-language films
Films directed by Hans Deppe
1958 films
Real Film films
Films shot at Wandsbek Studios
1950s German films